Shalersville Township is one of the eighteen townships of Portage County, Ohio, United States.  The 2010 census found 5,670 people in the township.

Geography
Located in the northwestern part of the county, it borders the following other townships and cities:
Mantua Township - north
Hiram Township - northeast corner
Freedom Township - east
Charlestown Township - southeast corner
Ravenna Township - south
Franklin Township - southwest corner
Streetsboro - west
Aurora - northwest corner

No municipalities are located in Shalersville Township.

Historic population figures
1960—2,823
1970—4,967
1980—5,268
1990—5,270
2000—5,976
2010—5,670

Name and history
Shalersville takes its name from its original proprietor, General Nathaniel Shaler and was originally known as "Middletown" as Shaler was a native of Middletown, Connecticut.  It is the only Shalersville Township statewide.  The first settlers, the family of Joel Baker of Tolland County, Connecticut, arrived in 1806 and the township government was organized in 1812.  The township was formed from town 4, range 8 of the Connecticut Western Reserve. A post office called Shalersville was established in 1824, and remained in operation until 1904.

Government
The township is governed by a three-member board of trustees, who are elected in November of odd-numbered years to a four-year term beginning on the following January 1. Two are elected in the year after the presidential election and one is elected in the year before it. There is also an elected township fiscal officer, who serves a four-year term beginning on April 1 of the year after the election, which is held in November of the year before the presidential election. Vacancies in the fiscal officership or on the board of trustees are filled by the remaining trustees.

Transportation
Ohio State Routes 303 and 44 pass through Shalersville and intersect at the middle of the township.  The Ohio Turnpike also cuts through Shalersville, and in the 1990s the exit at State Route 44 was added.  The Portage County Airport is located in the southern part of the township.

Notable residents
Bernie Kosar, former Cleveland Browns quarterback. Producer Matt, Jen and Tim Show

References

External links
Township website
County website
Mantua-Shalersville Chamber Of Commerce

Townships in Portage County, Ohio
Townships in Ohio
1812 establishments in Ohio
Populated places established in 1812